The statue of the Confederate States of America cavalry general Williams Carter Wickham by Edward Virginius Valentine was installed in Richmond, Virginia's Monroe Park in 1891, near Virginia Commonwealth University's main campus. It was toppled in June 2020 during the George Floyd protests.

Description
The bronze sculpture was designed by Edward Virginius Valentine. It measures approximately 7 ft. x 18 in. x 18 in., and rests on a granite base measuring approximately 10 ft. x 88 1/2 in. x 88 1/2 in. The statue depicts Williams Carter Wickham wearing a Confederate uniform and holding a case for his field glasses in his proper right hand. He holds a pair of gloves behind his back in his opposite hand. Originally, he had a sword, which was later removed by vandals. An inscription on the front of the base reads: 

Another on the back of the base reads:

History

Erected in 1891, the work was the gift of Williams' fellow soldiers and the employees of the Chesapeake and Ohio Railway.

Vandals stole Wickham's sword in August 1956.

The artwork was surveyed by the Smithsonian Institution's "Save Outdoor Sculpture!" in 1995.

In 2017, Clayton and Will Wickham, two of Wickham's descendants, requested that the city of Richmond remove the statue. In their letter to the city council, the brothers wrote that "as a plantation owner, Confederate general and industrialist, General Wickham unapologetically accrued power and wealth through the exploitation of enslaved people".
   
Public objections to the sculpture's presence in Monroe Park increased during the 2020 George Floyd protests. In June 2020, protesters toppled the sculpture using ropes.

See also

 1891 in art
 List of Confederate monuments and memorials in Virginia
 List of monuments and memorials removed during the George Floyd protests

References

External links
 

1891 establishments in Virginia
1891 sculptures
2020 disestablishments in Virginia
Bronze sculptures in Virginia
Destroyed sculptures
Granite sculptures in Virginia
Monuments and memorials in Virginia
Outdoor sculptures in Richmond, Virginia
Statues removed in 2020
Sculptures of men in Virginia
Statues in Virginia
Vandalized works of art in Virginia
Monuments and memorials in Virginia removed during the George Floyd protests